James K. Morrow (born 1947) is an American novelist and short-story writer.

James Morrow may also refer to:
 James Morrow (trade unionist) (1904–1986), Irish trade unionist and politician
 James Morrow (Manitoba politician) (1857–1949), politician in Manitoba, Canada
 James Morrow (dancer) (born 1976), American dancer and choreographer
 James A. Morrow (born 1941), American mathematician
 James A. Morrow Sr. (1892–1967), American politician from Mississippi
 James A. Morrow Jr. (1923–1990), American politician from Mississippi and son of the above
 James D. Morrow (born 1957), professor of world politics